Sanigar is an English surname originating in the Gloucestershire region of England. Documented alternative spellings include Saniger, Sanniger, Senigar and Sinnegar.

The name is medieval and probably derives from a location originally called Swan Hangra near Newtown, Berkeley on the Severn bank, meaning “the place of swans by the sloping wood”, which evolved into Sanigar and variants over time.

Further reading
http://www.ancestry.co.uk/name-origin?surname=sanigar

References